The Brownie was a series of cameras made by Eastman Kodak. Released in 1900, it introduced the snapshot to the masses. It was a basic cardboard box camera with a simple convex-concave lens that took 2 1/4-inch square pictures on No. 117 roll film. It was conceived and marketed for sales of Kodak roll films. Because of its simple controls and initial price of $1 along with the low price of Kodak roll film and processing, the Brownie camera surpassed its marketing goal.

Invention and etymology
It was invented by Frank A. Brownell for the Eastman Kodak Company. The name comes from the brownies (spirits in folklore) in Palmer Cox cartoons. Over 150,000 Brownie cameras were shipped in the first year of production. An improved model, called No. 2 Brownie came in 1901, which produced larger 3.25-by-2.25-inch (1.44:1 aspect ratio) photos and cost $2 and was also a huge success.

Marketing and notable uses

Brownies were extensively marketed to children, with Kodak using them to popularise photography. They were also taken to war by soldiers. As they were ubiquitous, many iconic shots were taken on Brownies.

On 15 April 1912, Bernice Palmer used a Kodak Brownie 2A, Model A to photograph the iceberg that sank RMS Titanic as well as survivors hauled aboard RMS Carpathia, the ship on which Palmer was travelling.

Having written an article in the 1940s for amateur photographers suggesting an expensive camera was unnecessary for quality photography, Picture Post photographer Bert Hardy used a Brownie camera to stage a carefully posed snapshot of 17-year-old Pat Stewart, a Tiller Girls dancer, with her friend, Wendy Clarke, sitting on railings of North Pier, Blackpool, for the cover of Picture Post.

Varieties
The cameras continued to be popular, and spawned many varieties, such as a Boy Scout edition in the 1930s. In 1940, Kodak released the Six-20 Flash Brownie, Kodak's first internally synchronized flash camera, using General Electric bulbs. In 1957, Kodak produced the Brownie Starflash, Kodak's first camera with a built-in flash.

The Brownie 127 was popular, selling in the millions between 1952 and 1967. It was a bakelite camera with a simple meniscus lens and a curved film plane to compensate for the deficiencies of the lens. Another model was the Brownie Cresta sold between 1955 and 1958. It used 120 film and had a fixed-focus lens.

The last official Brownie camera made was the Brownie II Camera, a 110 cartridge film model produced in Brazil for one year, 1986.

The Kodak Brownie Number 2 is a box camera that was manufactured by the Eastman Kodak Company from 1901 to 1935. There were five models, A through F, and it was the first camera to use 120 film. It also came with a viewfinder and a handle. The Brownie Number 2 was made of a choice of three materials: cardboard, costing US$2.00, aluminum, costing US$2.75, and a color model which cost US$2.50. It was a very popular and affordable camera, and many are still in use by film photographers.

Gallery

References

Further reading
, gives history of the Brownie camera line

External links

 Kodak Brownie, patented by George Eastman, filed July 1900
The Brownie Camera @ 100: A Celebration on the Kodak website
Kodak Brownie Target Six-20: A Review

Kodak cameras
Kodak Brownie 1
Cameras introduced in 1900
Products introduced in 1952